The Jack and Mary Lois Wheatley Institution of Brigham Young University (BYU) is a think tank whose mission is to "lift society by preserving and strengthening its core institutions". , the institution's director is Paul S. Edwards, who succeeded Richard N. Williams, its first director.

The organization started in 2007 and was founded through the efforts of Jack Wheatley. Wheatley previously spent more than 20 years on the board of Stanford University's Hoover Institution and wanted BYU's Wheatley Institution to fulfill a similar role.

The Wheatley Institution regularly invites outside speakers. In 2021, speaker-guests included Mitt Romney, Robert D. Putnam, and Rabbi Meir Soloveichik.

Previously, the Wheatley Institution hosted guests such as Zbigniew Brzezinski and Condoleezza Rice. These visits were organized by former senior fellow at the Wheatley Institution, Amos Jordan.

In October 2009, the Wheatley Institution sponsored a symposium opposing the New Atheism.

During the 2012-2013 academic year, the institution sponsored a series of speakers on scientism. Speakers included Daniel N. Robinson, Peter Hacker, Richard G. Swinburne, Bas van Fraassen, Lawrence Principe, Kenneth F. Schaffner, and Roger Scruton.

The Wheatley Institution's Executive Council consists of:
Charles S. Wheatley, Principal, Wheatley Financial Consulting LLC 
Kim B. Clark, a NAC Professor of Business Management at BYU's Marriott School of Business (MSB)
Ahmad S. Corbitt, first counselor in the Young Men General Presidency of the Church of Jesus Christ of Latter-day Saints
Brigitte C. Madrian; Dean and Marriott Distinguished Professor in BYU's MSB
C. Shane Reese; member; BYU Academic Vice President (AVP) 
Larry Howell; BYU Associate AVP for Research and Graduate Studies

References

Deseret News, Jan. 11, 2010
Wheatley Institution home page

2007 establishments in Utah
Brigham Young University